The following is a list of notable deaths in September 1966.

Entries for each day are listed alphabetically by surname. A typical entry lists information in the following sequence:
 Name, age, country of citizenship at birth, subsequent country of citizenship (if applicable), reason for notability, cause of death (if known), and reference.

September 1966

1 
 Karl Bergelt, German Navy officer during World War II (b. 1902)
 Mabel Capper, British suffragist (b. 1888)

2 
 George Bolt, Australian rules footballer (b. 1899)
 Isaya Mukirania, King of Rwenzururu

3 
 Constantin Bakaleinikoff, Russian-born American composer (b. 1896)
 Dick Barwegan, American professional football player (b. 1921)
 Sir Robert Bristow, English engineer (b. 1880)
 Chen Mengjia, Chinese archaeologist (b. 1911)
 Wesley Dennis, American illustrator (b. 1903)
 Fu Lei, Chinese translator and art critic (b. 1908)
 Frank Golding, Australian rules footballer (b. 1890)
 Irving Klaw, American pornographer (b. 1910)

4 
 Bernard Atkinson, English cricketer (b. 1900)
 August Aimé Balkema, Dutch book trader (b. 1906)
 Herbert Beyer, German paratrooper officer during World War II (b. 1913)

5 
 William Murdoch Buchanan, Canadian politician, member of the House of Commons of Canada (b. 1897) 
 Edward Denman Clarke, Finnish-born British flying ace of World War I (b. 1898)
 Edward English, English cricketer (b. 1864)
 George Koch, American football player (b. 1919)
 Dezső Lauber, Hungarian sportsman competed in the 1908 Summer Olympics, and architect (b. 1879)

6 
 Elmer Blaney Harris, American author (b. 1878)
 Einar W. Juva, Finnish historian and professor (b. 1892)
 Margaret Sanger, American birth control advocate (b. 1879)
 Hendrik Verwoerd, Dutch-born Prime Minister of South Africa (b. 1901)
 Gen. Leon Kromer, American Army general (b. 1876)
 Reuben Levy, British academic (b. 1891)

7 
 Viktor Ader, Estonian footballer (b. 1910)
 Al Kelly, Russian-born American comedian (b. 1896)

8 
 Walter Friedländer, German-American art historian (b. 1873)
 W. A. Hewitt, Canadian sportsman and journalist (b. 1875)

9 
 Jack Cobb, American basketball player (b. 1904)
 Bob Kelley, American sportscaster (b. 1917)

10 
 Blair Cherry, American baseball and football coach (b. 1901)
 Arthur Cock, Australian rules footballer (b. 1900)
 Saul Gorss, American actor (b. 1908)
 Emil Julius Gumbel, German-born American mathematician and academic (b. 1891)
 Piero Jahier, Italian poet, translator, and journalist (b. 1884)
 Vere Johns, Jamaican impresario (b. 1893)
 Francis Kendall, English cricketer (b. 1908)
 James Langridge, English cricketer (b. 1906)

11 
 Arthur Affleck, Australian pilot (b. 1903)
 Hans von Ahlfen, German General in the Second World War (b. 1897)
 Charley Aylett, Australian politician (b. 1913)
 Charlie Cantor, American radio actor (b. 1898)
 Bill Cramer, American baseball player (b. 1891)
 Eva Justin, German Holocaust perpetrator (b. 1909)
 C. E. Woolman, American Airlines founder (b. 1889)

12 
 Florence E. Allen, American judge; the first woman to serve on a state supreme court (Ohio), and one of the first two women to serve as a United States federal judge (b. 1884)
 Francis Sheed Anderson CB, Scottish businessman, civil servant and Liberal Party politician (b. 1897)
 Iosif Czako, Romanian footballer (b. 1906)
 Earl J. Glade, American politician, mayor of Salt Lake City, Utah (b. 1885)
 Norman Kendrew, English cricketer (b. 1908)
 Aketo Nakamura, Japanese general (b. 1889)
 Louis Wilkinson, British writer (b. 1881)

13 
 Wiktor Andersson, Swedish film actor (b. 1887)
 Dora Barton, English actress (b. 1884)
 Major General Francis William Billado, American military officer and politician, member of the Vermont House of Representatives, Adjutant General of the Vermont National Guard (b. 1907)
 Clemente Canepari, Italian racing cyclist (b. 1886)
 John Christoffersen, Danish wrestler, competed at the 1924 Summer Olympics (b. 1898)
 Ralph Comstock, American baseball player (b. 1887) 
 Alfred Engelsen, Norwegian gymnast and diver, gold medalist at the 1912 Summer Olympics (b. 1893)
 Alfred A. Gilman, American Anglican missionary to China (b. 1878)
 Tomoshige Samejima, Japanese admiral (b. 1889)

14 
 Gertrude Berg, American actress (b. 1899)
 Alexandre Bioussa, French rugby union player, member of the silver medal-winning French team at the 1924 Summer Olympics (b. 190])
 Nikolay Cherkasov, Soviet actor (b. 1903)
 Arthur Davies, English Anglican priest (b. 1878)
 Hiram Wesley Evans, American leader of the Ku Klux Klan (b. 1881)
 Cemal Gürsel, Turkish general and statesman, 4th President of Turkey (b. 1895)
 Geoffrey MacLaren, English cricketer (b. 1883)

15 
 Frank G. Ashbrook, American mammalogist (b. 1892)
 Leonard Brockington, Welsh-born Canadian civil servant, first president of the Canadian Broadcasting Corporation (b. 1888)
 Adm. Herbert G. Hopwood, American admiral (b. 1898)

16 
 Anandashram Swami, Indian ninth guru and the Head of the community of the Chitrapur Saraswats (b. 1902)
 Lawrence Joseph Bader, American whose disappearance and later reappearance caused controversy (b. 1926)
 Judah A. Joffe, Ukrainian-born American philologist (b. 1873)
 Carlos Kluwe, Brazilian footballer (b. 1890)

17 
 Selmer Berg, Canadian politician, member of the Legislative Assembly of Alberta (b. 1886)
 Mário Filho, Brazilian journalist and writer (b. 1908)
 Fritz Wunderlich, German tenor (b. 1930)

18 
 Ian Bedford, English cricketer (b. 1930)
 Gen. Horace H. Fuller, American general during World War II (b. 1886)
 Albert Johnson, American jockey (b. 1900)
 Dinny Lanigan, Irish hurler (b. 1891)

19 
 José de Jesús Angulo del Valle y Navarro, Mexican Roman Catholic bishop (b. 1888)
 Adrien Borel, French psychiatrist (b. 1886)
 Albert van der Sandt Centlivres, South African jurist, Chief Justice of South Africa (b. 1887) 
 Albert Divo, French race car driver (b. 1895)
 Gen. Vladimir Grigoryevich Fyodorov, Soviet weapons designer and general during World War II (b. 1874)
 Otto Kinkeldey, American musicologist (b. 1878)
 Bob Lang, American football player (b. 1892)
 Einar Langfeldt, Norwegian physician and professor (b. 1884)

20 
 William Baragwanath, Australian surveyor and geologist (b. 1878)
 Pierre E. Belliveau, Canadian politician, member of the Nova Scotia House of Assembly (b. 1896)
 Fritz Delius, German actor (b. 1890)
 Hubert L. Eaton, American businessman (b. 1881)
 James Gunn, American screenwriter (b. 1920)
 Mary Mackenzie, British actress (b. 1922)

21 
 James Jamieson, Scottish dentist (b. 1875)
 Billy Lane Lauffer, American soldier, recipient of the Medal of Honor (b. 1945)
 Paul Reynaud, French politician, former Prime Minister (b. 1878)

22 
 Valentin Bulgakov, Russian biographer (b. 1886)
 James A. Chapman, American oilman (b. 1881)
 Jules Furthman, American screenwriter (b. 1888)
 Aaron Grant, American football player (b. 1908)
 Hans Halberstadt, German-born American fencer, competed at the 1928 Summer Olympics (b. 1885)
 Ninon Hesse, Austro-Hungarian born wife of Herman Hesse (b. 1895)
 Edward Francis Hoban, American Roman Catholic archbishop (b. 1878)
 George Holloway, English cricketer (b. 1884)
 Frank Lentini, Italian-born American showman (b. 1889)
 Patrick Linstead, British chemist (b. 1902)
 Ray Maher, Australian politician, Speaker of the New South Wales Legislative Assembly (b. 1911)

23 
 William Beesley VC, English recipient of the Victoria Cross (b. 1895)
 Herbert J. Herring, American academic, dean of Duke University (b. 1899)

24 
Kálmán Blahó, Hungarian sprint canoer, competed at the 1948 Summer Olympics (b. 1920).
Walter Sillers, Jr., American lawyer, politician, landowner, and white supremacist (b. 1888).

25 
 Clifton Cushman, American athlete, silver medalist at the 1960 Summer Olympics (b. 1938)
 Sir Benjamin Dawson, 1st Baronet, British aristocrat (b. 1878)
 William Elsey, Australian Anglican priest, Bishop of Kalgoorlie (b. 1880)
 Jim Holder, American football player (b. 1940)
 Mina Loy, British writer (b. 1882)

26 
 Maghfoor Ahmad Ajazi, veteran Indian Independence activist (b.1900)
 Aleksandr Anufriyev, Soviet athlete, competed at the 1952 Summer Olympics (b.1926)
 Bill Atkinson, Australian rules footballer (b. 1876)
 Jimmy Bridges, English cricketer (b. 1887) 
 Gus Edson, American cartoonist (b. 1901)
 Andrew Keith Jack, Australian physicist and explorer of Antarctica (b. 1885)
 Helen Kane, American singer (b. 1904)
 Phil Hopkins, Welsh rugby player (b. 1880)
 Victor LaMer, American chemist (b. 1895)

27

28 
 André Breton, French poet and writer (b. 1896)
 Charles Lawrence Bishop, Canadian journalist and politician, member of the Canadian Senate (b. 1876)
 Eric Fleming, American actor (b. 1925)
 Chester A. Kowal, American politician, Mayor of Buffalo, New York (b. 1904)
 Erik Lindberg, Swedish sculptor, designed the Nobel Prize medals (b. 1873)

29 
 Zoilo Canavery, Uruguayan-born Argentine footballer (b. 1893)

30 
 John Barrett, American football player (b. 1899)
 Lt. Gen. Iven Mackay, Australian soldier and diplomat, general during World War II, and Australian High Commissioner to India (b. 1882)

References

1966-09
September 1966 events